Giovanni Battista del Tinto, O. Carm. (13 June 1622 – 19 May 1685) was a Roman Catholic prelate who served as Archbishop (Personal Title) of Cassano all'Jonio (1676–1685) and Archbishop of Trani (1666–1676).

Biography
Giovanni Battista del Tinto was born in Alvito, Lazio, Italy on 13 June 1622 and ordained a priest in the Order of Our Lady of Mount Carmel. On 15 February 1666, he was appointed during the papacy of Pope Alexander VII as Archbishop of Trani. On 22 February 1666, he was consecrated bishop by Federico Sforza, Cardinal-Priest of San Pietro in Vincoli, with Francesco Caetani, Titular Archbishop of Rhodus, and Joseph-Marie de Suarès, Bishop of Vaison, serving as co-consecrators. On 19 October 1676, he was appointed during the papacy of Pope Innocent XI as Archbishop (Personal Title) of Cassano all'Jonio. He served as Bishop of Cassano all'Jonio until his death on 19 May 1685.

References

External links and additional sources
 (for Chronology of Bishops) 
 (for Chronology of Bishops)  
 (for Chronology of Bishops) 
 (for Chronology of Bishops)  

17th-century Italian Roman Catholic archbishops
Bishops appointed by Pope Alexander VII
Bishops appointed by Pope Innocent XI
1622 births
1685 deaths
Carmelite bishops
Archbishops of Trani